The year 1666 in music involved some significant events.

Events
The Accademia Filarmonica di Bologna is founded.
King Charles II of England appoints Louis Grabu as Master of the King's Musick and a group of Italian musicians as the 'King's Italian Music'.
Jean-Baptiste Boësset and Jean-Baptiste Lully end their musical collaboration, which has lasted since 1653.
Antonio Stradivari makes the Ex Back violin.

Classical music
Giovanni Maria Bononcini – Primi frutti del giardino musicale, Op. 1 (10 trio sonatas da chiesa and five dances), published in Venice.
Dieterich Buxtehude 
Alles, was ihr tut mit Worten oder Werken, BuxWV 4
Benedicam Dominum, BuxWV 113
Johann Georg Ebeling – Morgen-Segen: Die güldne Sonne
John Playford -- Musick's Delight on the Cithren
Heinrich Schutz  
Matthäus-Passion, SWV 479
Johannes-Passion, SWV 481
Jean-Baptiste Lully 
Ballet des Muses, LWV 32
Le triomphe de Bacchus dans les Indes, LWV 30
Pavel Josef Vejvanovský – Sonata a 5

Opera
Antonio Draghi – La Mascherata
Carlo Pallavicino – Demetrio
Antonio Sartorio – Seleuco

Births
January 5 – Antonio Lotti, composer (died 1740)
April 6 – Angelo Michele Bartolotti, composer (died c. 1682)
April 18 – Jean-Féry Rebel, violinist and composer (died 1747)
April 25 – Johann Heinrich Buttstett, organist and composer (died 1727)
August 20 – Alphonse d' Eve, composer and singer (died 1727)
October – Nicolaus Vetter, organist and composer (died 1734)
November 1 – James Sherard, apothecary and musician (died 1738)
November 5 – Attilio Ariosti, composer (died 1729)
November 25 – Giuseppe Giovanni Battista Guarneri, violin maker (died c.1740)
December 5 – Francesco Scarlatti, composer (died 1741)
date unknown 
Carlo Francesco Cesarini, composer (died 1741)
Michelangelo Faggioli, composer (died 1733)
David Tecchler, luthier (died 1748)

Deaths
January 24 – Johann Andreas Herbst, composer and music theorist, 77
February 24 – Nicholas Lanier, singer, composer and artist, 77
May 6 – Paul Siefert, organist and composer, 79
June 30 – Adam Krieger, German composer, 32

References